Jorge Gustavo Lucardi (13 November 1928 – 22 January 2016) was an Argentine equestrian. He competed in the team jumping event at the 1960 Summer Olympics.

References

External links
 

1928 births
2016 deaths
Argentine male equestrians
Olympic equestrians of Argentina
Equestrians at the 1960 Summer Olympics
Pan American Games medalists in equestrian
Pan American Games silver medalists for Argentina
Equestrians at the 1955 Pan American Games
Sportspeople from Buenos Aires
Medalists at the 1955 Pan American Games